Lactarius longipilus is a member of the large milk-cap genus Lactarius in the order Russulales. Found in Chiang Mai Province (northern Thailand), it was described as new to science in 2010. The mushrooms were found at an elevation of  growing in a forest dominated by Castanopsis spp., Lithocarpus sp., and Pinus kesiya.

See also
List of Lactarius species

References

External links

longipilus
Fungi described in 2010
Fungi of Asia